The University Golf Club is a public golf club located in Pacific Spirit Regional Park near the city of Vancouver, British Columbia, Canada and the University of British Columbia.  It is owned and operated by Musqueam Capital Corporation. 

The land was previously owned by UBC since 2003 when it was acquired from the province and leased to course owner David Ho since 1990

History of the club 
University Golf Club was designed by A.V. Macan, and was opened as a public course in 1929 by John Boyd. It was originally named Westward Ho!, but became known to the public by its current name in 1985. The project was originally estimated to have cost little more than $70,000 to $80,000 to complete.

Currently the club does not offer membership of any kind, hence the club's motto: Non-members only.

2007 potential close  
The future of the course had at one point been called into question, according to an article in the Vancouver Sun newspaper published on June 27, 2007. The local Musqueam Indian Band was attempting to buy the land which the course occupies in order to build housing, however there is a land use covenant in place restricting the use of the land to a golf course for a "long-term period". The Musqueam Band offered in 2003 to buy the course on the understanding that it would honour the land use covenant.

See also
List of golf courses in British Columbia

External links 
 University Golf Club

References 

Golf clubs and courses in British Columbia
Golf clubs and courses designed by A. V. Macan